Chahar Taq or Chahartaq or Chehar Taq, also rendered as Chahar Tagh, may refer to:
 Chahartaq (architecture)
 Chahar Taq, Chaharmahal and Bakhtiari
 Chahar Taq, East Azerbaijan
 Chahar Taq, Darab, Fars Province
 Chahar Taq, Jahrom, Fars Province
 Chahar Taq, Kazerun, Fars Province
 Chahar Taq, Lamerd, Fars Province
 Chahar Taq, Marvdasht, Fars Province
 Chahar Taq, Rostam, Fars Province
 Chahar Taq, Hamadan
 Chahartaq, Baft, Kerman Province
 Chahar Taq, Bardsir, Kerman Province
 Chahar Taq, Markazi
 Chahar Taq, Razavi Khorasan
 Chahar Taq, Fariman, Razavi Khorasan Province
 Chahar Taq-e Bala, Semnan Province
 Chahar Taq, West Azerbaijan
 Chahar Taq, Zanjan